The 1962 Oregon Webfoots football team represented the University of Oregon during the 1962 NCAA University Division football season.  In their twelfth season under head coach Len Casanova and fourth as an independent, the Webfoots compiled a 6–3–1 record and outscored their opponents 229 to 156. Three home games were played on campus at Hayward Field in Eugene and one at Multnomah Stadium in Portland.

The team's statistical leaders included Bob Berry with 995 passing yards and Mel Renfro with 753 rushing yards and 298 receiving yards.

In October, Oregon traveled to Air Force to play in the dedication game for the new Falcon Stadium, which included a flyover by the Thunderbirds. This was during the early stages of the Cuban Missile Crisis, which was disclosed to the nation by President John F. Kennedy two days later on Monday.

Schedule

Roster
QB Bob Berry, So.
HB Mel Renfro, Jr.

References

External links
 WSU Libraries: Game video – Washington State at Oregon – November 10, 1962

Oregon
Oregon Ducks football seasons
Oregon Webfoots football